Ala is a comune in Trentino, north-eastern Italy. Until the First World War, it was an important border town between the Kingdom of Italy and the Austro Hungarian Empire.

It was the birthplace in 1896 of the supercentenarian Venere Pizzinato who lived to be 114.

References

External links
 Official website